Svärdet (Swedish: "the sword") was a Swedish warship that sank on 1 June 1676 at the Battle of Öland during the Scanian War, with most of its crew.

History 
Svärdet  was, during the Scanian War, under the command of Claes Uggla, and fought in  the Battle of Öland. She was surrounded early in the battle, and fought for two hours until her main mast was destroyed and the ship surrendered. Before the surrounding enemies could board Svärdet, a Dutch fireship accidentally set her ablaze. The fire eventually reached the gunpowder store, which set off an explosion that sank the ship. Only about 50 of a crew of nearly 650 men survived.

On 15 November 2011, it was announced that a wreck believed to be Svärdet had been found by divers off the island coast of Öland.

General characteristics
Displacement: 1700 tonnes
Length: 47.5 meters
Width: 12.5 meters
Armament: 86 cannons
12 36-pounders (lower gun deck)
4 30-pounders (lower gun deck)
14 24-pounders (lower gun deck)
26 12-pounders (upper gun deck)
4 8-pounders (upper gun deck)
20 8-pounders (weather deck)
6 3-pounders (weather deck)
Crew: 650 (both sailors and soldiers)

See also
 Vasa, a Swedish warship which foundered and sank in 1628, was rediscovered in 1956, and was subsequently recovered
 Kronan, a Swedish warship that floundered in rough weather in 1676, was rediscovered in 1980, with artefacts on display in Kalmar County Museum
 Mars, a Swedish warship which sank in 1564, and was rediscovered in 2011, and is under active exploration

References

External links
Discovery

Shipwrecks in the Baltic Sea
Maritime incidents in 1676
1660s ships
Ships of the line
Age of Sail ships of Sweden
Shipwrecks of Sweden